The Șoimul is a right tributary of the river Putna in Romania. It flows into the Putna near Mirceștii Noi. Though the river channel was straightened and resectioned and flood control dykes were built, the village of Vânători is frequently flooded by the river, at least four times in the years 2005-2006

References

Rivers of Romania
Rivers of Vrancea County